Augusto Dutra da Silva de Oliveira (born 16 July 1990) is a Brazilian track and field athlete who competes in the pole vault. He has personal bests of 5.82 metres (outdoor) and 5.71 m (indoors).

Born in Marília in Brazil's São Paulo state, de Oliveira first competed internationally in 2009: he won the South American Junior title with a vault of 4.90 metres and placed fourth at the 2009 Pan American Junior Athletics Championships. His personal best that year was 5.00 m. He began training under Elson Miranda, a former pole vaulter, with the Clube Atletismo BM&F Bovespa.

The following year he took the title at the 2010 South American Games (which doubled as the South American Under-23 Championships). He improved his best to 5.40 metres in May and went on to place second nationally at the Brazilian Athletics Championships. He was fourth at the 2011 South American Championships in Athletics. His 2012 was highlighted by a new personal best of 5.45 m and a silver medal at the 2012 Ibero-American Championships in Athletics.

At the beginning of 2013, he rapidly ascended to the top of the regional rankings. He cleared a South American indoor record of 5.66 m, then another of 5.71 m in March. He won at the Grande Premio Brasil Caixa de Atletismo with an outdoor best of 5.70 m, beating reigning South American champion Fabio Gomes da Silva. Later that week in Uberlândia, he broke da Silva's outdoor continental mark with a vault of 5.81 m.

On June 22, 2013, he broke the South American record again with a 5.82 mark.

He competed at the 2020 Summer Olympics.

Personal bests
Pole vault: 5.82 m –  Hof, 22 June 2013

International competition record

References

External links

Tilastopaja biography

Living people
1990 births
Brazilian male pole vaulters
People from Marília
World Athletics Championships athletes for Brazil
Athletes (track and field) at the 2016 Summer Olympics
Olympic athletes of Brazil
South American Games gold medalists for Brazil
South American Games medalists in athletics
Competitors at the 2010 South American Games
Competitors at the 2014 South American Games
Athletes (track and field) at the 2018 South American Games
Athletes (track and field) at the 2019 Pan American Games
Pan American Games silver medalists for Brazil
Pan American Games medalists in athletics (track and field)
Pan American Games athletes for Brazil
South American Championships in Athletics winners
Medalists at the 2019 Pan American Games
Ibero-American Championships in Athletics winners
South American Games gold medalists in athletics
Athletes (track and field) at the 2020 Summer Olympics
Sportspeople from São Paulo (state)